The Shadow DN11 was a Formula One car used by the Shadow team during the 1980. It was driven by Stefan Johansson, Geoff Lees, and David Kennedy. It was powered by the commonly used  Cosworth DFV V8 engine.

Complete Formula One results

(key)

References

Shadow Formula One cars